is a Japanese construction and real estate company for apartment buildings founded in 1961. In early 2008, it was reported that Anabuki became Japan's leading seller of condominia, ending Daikyo's 29 year lead.

The company advertising mascot Anabukin-chan is a little girl based on Little Red Riding Hood. Her name is a pun on "Akazukin-chan", which is Little Red Riding Hood's name in Japan.

References 

 http://www.shikoku-np.co.jp/kagawa_news/economy/article.aspx?id=20090605000079

External links 
  (in Japanese)

Real estate companies established in 1961
Construction and civil engineering companies established in 1961
Construction and civil engineering companies based in Tokyo
Real estate companies based in Tokyo
Japanese companies established in 1961